Pietje Bell (orig. Dutch: Pietje Bell boeken) is a series of children's books written by the Dutch writer Chris van Abkoude.

The story has been adapted to film twice. Once, in 1964, as De Avonturen van Pietje Bell, by Henk van der Linden and again in 2002 and 2003 by Maria Peters. 

In 2003, Ruud Bos adapted the novel into a musical called Pietje Bell de Musical.

Dick Matena also adapted the novel into a comic book album.

References

External links
 A website about the Pietje Bell novels (Dutch)

Dutch novels
Dutch children's novels
Novel series
Novels set in the 1910s
Novels set in the Netherlands
Rotterdam in fiction
Bell, Pietje
Bell, Pietje
Bell, Pietje
Bell, Pietje
Bell, Pietje
1914 novels
Dutch novels adapted into films
Dutch novels adapted into plays
Novels adapted into comics
1914 children's books
Bell, Pietje